Illius qui se pro divini is a papal bull issued by Pope Eugene IV in December 1442. Eugene granted plenary indulgence to the knights and friars of the Order of Christ, and all other Christians, who fought in the crusade against the Saracens under the leadership of Prince Henry the Navigator. A clause in the bull ensured that the indulgence would be valid even if Henry was not present in the crusade.

Notes

15th-century papal bulls
Documents of Pope Eugene IV